Organization for Collection and Sale of State-owned Properties of Iran (OCSSPI), founded in 2001, is affiliated to the Ministry of Economic Affairs and Finance of Iran. Its main purpose is to focus all matters relating to the collection, storage, management and sale of properties that by law are under the ownership, possession, custody or management of the government of Iran.

See also
Setad

References

External links
Official Website

Economy of Iran
Government of Iran
2001 establishments in Iran
Privatization in Iran